Dowry deaths are deaths of married women who are murdered or driven to suicide over disputes about dowry. Dowry deaths are found predominantly in India, Pakistan, Bangladesh, and Iran.

India reports the highest total number of dowry deaths with 8,391 such deaths reported in 2010, meaning there are 1.4 deaths per 100,000 women. Female dowry deaths account for 40 to 50 percent of all female homicides recorded annually in India, representing a stable trend over the period 1999 to 2016. Adjusted for population, Pakistan, with 2,000 reported such deaths per year, has the highest rate of dowry death at 2.45 per 100,000 women.

India
Dowry deaths relate to a bride's suicide or killing committed by her husband and his family soon after the marriage because of their dissatisfaction with the dowry.  It is typically the culmination of a series of prior domestic abuses by the husband's family. Most dowry deaths occur when the young woman, unable to bear the harassment and torture, commits suicide. Most of these suicides are by hanging, poisoning or by fire. Sometimes the woman is killed by being set on fire by her husband or inlaws; this is known as "bride burning", and is sometimes disguised as suicide or accident. Death by burning of Indian women has been more frequently attributed to dowry conflicts. In dowry deaths, the groom's family is the perpetrator of murder or suicide.

India has by far the highest number of dowry-related deaths in the world according to Indian National Crime Record Bureau. In 2012, 8,233 dowry death cases were reported across India. This means a bride was burned every 90 minutes, or dowry issues cause 1.4 deaths per year per 100,000 women in India.

According to a 1996 report by Indian police, every year it receives over 2,500 reports of bride-burning. The Indian National Crime Records Bureau (NCRB) reports that there were 8,331 dowry death cases registered in India in 2011. Incidents of dowry deaths during the year 2008 (8,172) have increased by 14.4 per cent over the 1998 level (7,146), while India's population grew at 17.6% over the 10-year period. The accuracy of these figures have received a great deal of scrutiny from critics who believe dowry deaths are consistently under-reported.

Dowry deaths in India are not limited to any specific religion.

Prohibition
The Dowry Prohibition Act of 1961 prohibits the request, payment or acceptance of a dowry, "as consideration for the marriage", where "dowry" is defined as a gift demanded or given as a precondition for a marriage. Gifts given without a precondition are not considered dowry, and are legal. It replaced several pieces of anti-dowry legislation that had been enacted by various Indian states. Murder and suicide under compulsion are addressed by India's criminal penal code.

Indian women's rights activists campaigned for more than 40 years for laws to contain dowry deaths, such as the Dowry Prohibition Act 1961 and the more stringent Section 498a of Indian Penal Code (enacted in 1983). Under the Protection of Women from Domestic Violence Act 2005 (PWDVA), a woman can put a stop to the dowry harassment by approaching a domestic violence protection officer. After conducting field research, Shalu Nigam questioned the effectiveness of these laws, writing, "courts frequently ended up offering them compulsory counseling, which entails undesired results and narrow options," and noting "Laws could neither address the immediate needs of victims nor could offer practical remedies in terms of medical aid, short-stay homes, creche facilities, psychological support, shelter homes or economic or material assistance to the women which they need the most."

Although Indian laws against dowries have been in effect for decades, they have been largely criticised as being ineffective. The practice of dowry deaths and murders continues to take place unchecked in many parts of India and this has further added to the concerns of enforcement.

Pakistan
In Pakistan, the giving and expectation of a dowry (called Jahez) is part of the culture, with over 95% of marriages in every region of Pakistan involving transfer of a dowry from the bride's family to a groom's family.

Dowry deaths have been rising in Pakistan for decades.  Dowry-related violence and deaths have been widespread since Pakistan became an independent nation. At over 2,000 dowry-related deaths per year, and annual rates exceeding 2.45 deaths per 100,000 women from dowry-related violence, Pakistan has the highest reported number of dowry death rates per 100,000 women in the world.

There is some controversy on the dowry death rates in Pakistan. Some publications suggest Pakistan officials do not record dowry deaths, and that the death rates are culturally under-reported and may be significantly higher. For example, Nasrullah reports total average annual stove burn rates of 33 per 100,000 women in Pakistan, of which 49% were intentional, or an average annual rate of about 16 per 100,000 women.

Pakistan's Dowry and Marriage Gifts (Restriction) Bill, 2008, restricts dowry to PKR 30,000 (~US$300) while the total value of bridal gifts is limited to PKR 50,000. The law made demands for a dowry by the groom's family illegal, as well as public display of dowry before or during the wedding. However, this and similar anti-dowry laws of 1967, 1976 and 1998, as well as Family Court Act of 1964 have proven to be unenforceable. Activists such as SACHET, Pakistan claim the police refuse to register and prosecute allegations of dowry-related domestic violence and fatal injuries.

Various military and democratically elected civil governments in Pakistan have tried to outlaw traditional display of dowry and expensive parties (walima). One such attempt was the Act of 1997, Ordinance (XV) of 1998 and Ordinance (III) of 1999. These were challenged in the Supreme Court of Pakistan. The petitioner cited a number of hadiths under religious Sharia laws to demonstrate that Islam encouraged walima and related customary practices. The petitioner claimed that the Pakistan government's effort to enact these laws are against the injunctions of Islam. The Supreme Court ruled these laws and ordinances unconstitutional.

Bangladesh

In Bangladesh, dowry is called joutuk (Bengali: যৌতুক), and a significant cause of deaths as well. Between 0.6 and 2.8 brides per year per 100,000 women are reported to die because of dowry-related violence in recent years. The methods of death include suicides, fire and other forms of domestic violence. In 2013, Bangladesh reported 4,470 women were victims of dowry-related violence over a 10-month period, or dowry violence victimized about 7.2 brides per year per 100,000 women in Bangladesh.

Iran
Dowry is an ancient custom of Persia, and locally called jahâz (sometimes spelled jahiziyeh). Dowry-related violence and deaths in Iran are reported in Iranian newspapers, some of which appear in English media. Kiani et al., in a 2014 study, report dowry deaths in Iran. Iranian director Maryam Zahirimehr's 2018 film "Endless?" addresses trauma related to a dowry death in Iran.

International efforts at eradication
Reports of incidents of dowry deaths have attracted public interest and sparked a global activist movement seeking to end the practice. Of this activist community, the United Nations (UN) has played a pivotal role in combating violence against women, including dowry deaths.

United Nations
The United Nations has been an advocate for women's rights since its inception in 1945, explicitly stating so in its Charter's Preamble, the Universal Declaration of Human Rights (adopted in 1948), the International Covenant on Civil and Political Rights (adopted in 1966), the International Covenant on Economic, Social and Cultural Rights (also adopted in 1966) (these three documents are known collectively as the International Bill of Rights) and the Convention on the Elimination of All Forms of Discrimination Against Women (CEDAW) (2012).

The United Nations Children's Fund (UNICEF), though predominately focused on improving the quality of education available to children globally, has also taken a proactive stance against dowry death. On March 9 (International Women's Day), 2009, at a press conference in Washington D.C., UNICEF's Executive Director, Ann M. Veneman, publicly condemned dowry deaths and the legislative systems which allow the culprits to go unpunished. In 2009, UNICEF launched its first Strategic Priority Action Plan for Gender Equality, which was followed by a second Action Plan in 2010. The aim of these plans has been to make gender equality a higher priority within all international UNICEF programs and functions.

Private organizations
Amnesty International, in an effort to educate the public, has cited dowry deaths as a major contributor to global violence against women. Also, in their annual human rights evaluations, Amnesty International criticizes India for the occurrences of dowry deaths as well as the impunity provided to its perpetrators.

Human Rights Watch has also criticized the Indian government for its inability to make any progress towards eliminating dowry deaths and its lackluster performance for bringing its perpetrators to justice in 2011. In 2004, the Global Fund for Women launched its "Now or Never" funding project. This campaign hopes to raise funds domestically and consequently finance the efforts of feminist organizations across the globe – including Indian women's rights activists.  the Now or Never fund has raised and distributed about $7 million.

A relatively smaller organization, V-Day, has dedicated itself to ending violence against women. By arranging events such as plays, art shows, and workshops in communities and college campuses across the United States, V-Day raises funds and educates the public on topics of gender-based violence including dowry death. Full-length plays on dowry deaths include 'The Bride Who Would Not Burn'

See also
 Bride burning
 Domestic violence in India
 Dowry system in India
 Kerala snakebite murder

References

Further reading
 Dowry Murder: The Imperial Origins of a Cultural Crime, by Veena Talwar Oldenburg. Published by Oxford University Press, 2002.
 Dowry and Protection to Married Women, by Paras Diwan, Peeyushi Diwan. Published by Deep & Deep Publications, 1987.
 Crime in Marriages, a Broad Spectrum, by Poornima Advani. Published by Gopushi Publishers, 1994.
 Encyclopaedia of violence against women and dowry death in India, by Kalpana Roy. Published by Anmol Publications PVT. LTD., 1999. .
 Dowry Death in India, by Geetanjali Mukherjee. Published by Indian Publishers Distributors, 1999. .
 Dowry Death, by Kamakshya Prasad, Jawaid Ahmad Khan, Hari Nath Upadhyaya. Published by Modern Law Publications, 2000. .
 Women in South Asia: Dowry Death and Human Rights Violations, by Pramod Kumar Mishra. Published by Authorspress, 2000. .
 Dowry murder: the imperial origins of a cultural crime, by Veena Talwar Oldenburg. Published by Oxford University Press US, 2002. .
 Death by Fire: Sati, Dowry, Death, and Female Infanticide in Modern India, by Mala Sen. Published by Rutgers University Press, 2002. .

External links
 Article by women's activist Madhu Kishwar
 Indian National Crime Bureau Data on Dowry Deaths
 Indian newspaper articles on Dowry Deaths
 – National Commission for Women, (NCW) India
 Death of two women due to dowry demands
 Leaders of community call for an end to lavish wedding celebrations
 Dowry Disgrace and Suicides
 Most dowry victims in State of Punjab(India) are poisoned

Domestic violence
Femicide
Violence against women in India
Women's rights in India
Marriage in India
Causes of death